Rüştü Pasha or Rushdi Pasha (1872 – July 13, 1926) was an officer of the Ottoman Army and a general of the Turkish Army. He became a leader of the Progressive Republican Party, being a member of its Central Administrative Committee. He was hanged for his involvement in the İzmir assassination attempt against Mustafa Kemal (Atatürk) in 1926.

Medals and decorations
Order of the Medjidieh 5th and 3rd Class
Gallipoli Star (Ottoman Empire)
Silver Medal of Liyaqat
Silver Medal of Imtiyaz
Gold Medal of Liyaqat
Prussia Order of the Crown (Prussia)
Medal of Independence with Red Ribbon

See also
List of high-ranking commanders of the Turkish War of Independence

Sources

External links

1872 births
1926 deaths
People from Erzurum
Ottoman Imperial School of Military Engineering alumni
Ottoman Army officers
Ottoman military personnel of the Balkan Wars
Ottoman military personnel of World War I
Turkish military personnel of the Turkish–Armenian War
Turkish Army generals
Deputies of Erzurum
People executed for treason against Turkey
20th-century executions for treason
Executed military personnel
Executed Turkish people
Recipients of the Order of the Medjidie, 3rd class
Recipients of the Liakat Medal
Recipients of the Imtiyaz Medal
Recipients of the Iron Cross (1914)
Recipients of the Medal of Independence with Red Ribbon (Turkey)
People executed by Turkey by hanging